June Malia (or June Malliah) is an Indian actress who predominantly works in Bengali cinema and television. She is a philanthropist and also a member of West Bengal Women's Commission. In 2021, she was elected as Member of West Bengal Legislative Assembly from Medinipur constituency. Her daughter is model Shivangini Maliah.

Filmography

 Lathi (1996)
 Hothat Brishti (1998)
 Bor Kone (2002)
 Nil Nirjane (2003)
 Aamar Mayer Shapath (2003)
 The Bong Connection (2006)
 Shikar (2006)
 Podokkhep (2007)
 Lovesongs (2008)
 Raktamukhi Neela - A Murder Mystery (2008)
 Prem Bibhrat (2012)
 Hathat Vishon Valo Lagchhe (2012)
 Sabdhan Pancha Aaschhe (2012)
 Teen Yaari Katha (2012)
 Obhishopto Nighty (2014)
 Ebar Shabor (2015)
 Har Har Byomkesh (2015)
 Ekla Chalo (2015)
 Zulfiqar (2016)
 Romantic Noy (2016)
 Meri Pyaari Bindu (2017)
 Porobashinee (2017)
 Sweater (2019) 
 Mitin Mashi (2019)
 Kishmish (2022)
 Khela Jokhon (2022)

Documentary
  Out in India: A Family's Journey (2008)

Web Series/ Short Films
 Virgin Mohito (2018) (Addatimes)
Karkat Rogue (2020) (ZEE5)
Srikanto (2022) (Hoichoi)

Television
 Didi No. 1 (reality game show)
 Dhyatterika
 Shirinra (Telefilm)
 Babushona (Comedy show)
 Dance Bangla Dance (Dance reality show)
Kacher Manush
Behula
Resham Jhapi
Sob Choritro Kalponik
Sanjher Bati
Gantchhora

References

Notes

Citation

External links
 

Living people
1970 births
People from Darjeeling
Actresses from Kolkata
Actresses in Bengali cinema
Bengali television actresses
Indian television actresses
Indian film actresses
Politicians from Kolkata
West Bengal politicians
Trinamool Congress politicians from West Bengal
West Bengal MLAs 2021–2026
Women in West Bengal politics
Women members of the West Bengal Legislative Assembly
Indian actor-politicians
21st-century Indian actresses
21st-century Indian women politicians